Mitch Dudek (born November 9, 1943) is a former American football tackle. He played for the New York Jets in 1966.

References

1943 births
Living people
Sportspeople from Evanston, Illinois
Players of American football from Illinois
American football tackles
Xavier Musketeers football players
New York Jets players